The 1890–91 season was Sheffield United's second, and their first and only season playing in the newly formed Midland Counties League, as the club sought to establish itself as a major footballing force.  The team was selected by the club's football committee and coached by a trainer, but day-to-day affairs were overseen by club secretary Joseph Wostinholm.  The club saw a large influx of players during the season as it continued to bolster its numbers with amateurs loaned or signed from other teams in the local area, a policy that resulted in an unsettled side, indifferent league results, and a mid-table finish.

United (nicknamed the Blades) entered the FA Cup once more but were lucky to reach the first round proper, losing to Burton Swifts during qualifying only to see the Staffordshire club disqualified. They also competed in the Wharncliffe Charity Cup and the Sheffield Challenge Cup, in which they were beaten finalists for the second year in succession.

The development of the playing squad continued with the signings of John Drummond and Billy Hendry from Preston North End, who brought experience and a solid professionalism.  Harry Lilley was recruited in the early part of the season, and became a regular in United's defence for several seasons.

Background
After a first season of mixed fortunes on the field the football committee recognised the appetite amongst the Sheffield public for the game, as attendances at Bramall Lane had steadily increased.  They recognised that league football was essential to grow that interest and offer a better standard of opposition, and had therefore joined the recently created Midland Counties League, although still insisting on organising numerous friendly fixtures.  The committee continued to select the team, although J. B. Wostinholm oversaw the day–to–day running of the club.

Kit
Although United's jersey remained predominantly white, thin red vertical stripes were introduced for the first time, which evolved into the solid red and white stripes that the team still plays in today.  The team retained the blue shorts and socks worn in the previous season.

Season overview

Midland Counties League
The previous season had been considered reasonably successful, but United still looked to improve the quality of players in the squad.  The players recruited from Scotland during the previous summer had failed to live up to expectations and the majority of them were released; only Calder and Robertson were retained. Billy Bridgewater and Edward Cross were signed from nearby Rotherham Town, and Harry Lilley arrived from Staveley during the close season, but the Blades persisted with their policy of utilising guest amateur players from the local area.

United were now playing in the Midland Counties League but results were indifferent, with the Blades winning only twice in their opening eight fixtures.  Their fortunes began to improve in November and December however as they registered a series of victories including an impressive 4–0 win over Kidderminster at Bramall Lane and a 5–2 victory at Derby Midland.  Despite the relative failure of their previous recruitment in Scotland, by the end of the year United had signed Gavin Crawford and Harry Munro from north of the border as the Blades entered 1891 in more positive form.

Following a league fixture break during January 1891 United resumed their campaign in February, but the form they had shown in the run up to Christmas deserted them, and results were inconsistent.  In the midst of congested fixture list the Blades finished the season fifth in the league (out of ten sides) and once again resolved to improve the quality of players by recruiting established professionals ahead of the next season.  They duly negotiated the transfers of  John Drummond, Billy Hendry and Samuel Dobson from Preston North End, then one of the top sides in the country, and they arrived over a number of weeks through February and March to bolster United's first team options. The most significant signing during the season was that of a young Ernest Needham from Staveley in February 1891. Although he did not play for United in the 1890–91 season he went on to become one of the club's greatest players, making more than 500 appearances.

FA Cup
Having had relative success during their first FA Cup campaign the previous season United struggled to replicate that form and were fortunate to make it past the qualifying rounds in 1890.  Having narrowly defeated Derby Junction they lost 2–1 to Burton Swifts in the next game, but the Staffordshire club was subsequently disqualified for fielding an ineligible player.  Matlock and Loughborough were then easily despatched as United reached the first round proper of the cup for the second time.   This was as far as the Blades would progress however, as they met Notts County at Bramall Lane in mid–January only to be trounced 9–1 by the visitors, a result that remains the club's worst in the competition.

Local cups
United once again entered the Sheffield Challenge Cup and reached the final for the second season in succession.  After a straightforward 7–1 victory over Attercliffe in round one the Blades made their way past Kilnhurst in the semi-final at the second time of asking.  On 21 March they met near neighbours Doncaster Rovers in the final, but despite having home advantage, with the game being played at Bramall Lane, United lost 2–1.

The team entered the Wharncliffe Charity Cup at the semi-final stage but were drawn against established cross-city rivals The Wednesday.  Despite increasing rivalry between the clubs, a relatively small crowd of just over 3,000 spectators were present at Wednesday's Olive Grove ground to watch them beat United 2–1.

Friendlies
Despite now playing competitive league football United continued to fill the fixture list with numerous friendlies, which ultimately led to them playing 64 first-team games over the course of eight months.   There was a noticeable improvement in the quality of opposition however, as a number of the more established professional teams visited Bramall Lane during the first half of the season, drawing reasonable crowds in the process.  Although there were early season losses to Everton and Preston North End, United secured victories against Bolton Wanderers and Derby County, both at the time members of the Football League First Division.

The second half of the season saw a continued run of exhibition games but the quality of opposition was, at times, not as high.  Despite lesser opposition, results tailed off as the fixture congestion these games created began to take its toll on the squad, most notably at the point when United's involvement in the Sheffield Challenge Cup meant that they had two first-team games scheduled for the same day.  Rather than cancelling the pre-arranged friendlies the Blades went ahead with both fixtures, splitting the first team between them.   The highlight of the fixture calendar did result from a friendly match however, as a then record 14,000 Sheffielders were present at Bramall Lane in January to watch United beat local rivals The Wednesday for the first time, running out 3–2 victors.   January also saw United take on their first ever non–English team when they played Scottish side Linthouse, although the match was limited to only 35 minutes each way owing to poor light.

Squad
Source:

First team

Players leaving before end of the season

Transfers

In

Out

League table

Squad statistics

Appearances and goals

|-
|colspan="10"|Players who left before the end of the season:

|}

Top scorers

Results
Source:

Key

Midland Counties League

FA Cup
Source:

Sheffield Challenge Cup
Source:

Wharncliffe Charity Cup
Source:

Friendlies
Source:

Notes
Source:

References

Bibliography

External links
 Sheffield United F.C. Official Website

Sheffield United F.C. seasons
Sheffield United